Brave: A Warrior's Tale  is an action-adventure video game by American developer Collision Studios and published by Evolved Games and SouthPeak Games for the Xbox 360 (not compatible with Xbox One), and Wii. The Xbox 360 version came out on August 4, and the Wii version on August 10.

Armed with Brave's stories and teachings, as well as various weapons including the Spirit Dancer's Tomahawk and the powerful Warrior's Bow, Courage battles dangerous creatures such as fierce wolves, fallen warriors and the Wendigo in order to protect his tribe.

Development
"Brave: A Warrior's Tale" is an HD Port of Brave: The Search for Spirit Dancer, with 720p resolution and has 4x AA with V-sync turned on. The Wii version includes a changed control scheme. .

Reception

Brave: A Warrior's Tale has received generally negative reviews.

Chris Watters of GameSpot stated, "A cruelly hijacked story makes this otherwise serviceable game a pale shadow of adventures past." Watters gave the Xbox 360 version a score of 4.5/10.

Tom Price of TeamXbox called the game a "standard third-person action-adventure game" that "lacks all the charm of a Banjo-Kazooie type of world." Price also noticed several in-game bugs, stating, "I can’t tell you how many times I fell through solid objects or had the game completely freeze up on me." Price gave the game 2.5/10, accounting for its lowest rating.

Dylan Platt of GameZone gave the same version 5.5/10, saying, "In bringing the game to the 360 [from the PlayStation 2], Collision Studios added some pretty terrible new content, and not a small number of bugs and glitches." Platt also stated that, "The moment-to-moment gameplay of Brave’s sequences are fairly fun (though bugs are far more frequent than they should be), but the beginning and ending Courage segments are frustrating, poorly designed, and ridiculously glitchy."

References

External links
 Official web site
 

2009 video games
Action-adventure games
SouthPeak Games
Video games featuring protagonists of selectable gender
PlayStation Portable games
Video games based on Native American mythology
Video games developed in the United States
Wii games
Xbox 360 games
Single-player video games
Evolved Games games